Falling Creek Camp is a traditional summer camp for boys, founded on Christian values. It is located on over 900 private mountaintop acres in Tuxedo, North Carolina. Falling Creek was founded in 1969 by Jim Miller. Sessions range from one to four weeks for rising 1st through 12th grade boys, and Father/Son Weekends are offered. In addition to the classic camp activities, campers can choose to participate daily in a variety of out-of-camp adventure trips, ranging in skill level from introductory to advanced, and from one-day trips to five-day trips.

Mission and Code

Falling Creek's purpose statement is, "We exist to shepherd the journey of personal growth through love and adventure."
Falling Creek’s mission is to provide a setting, a program, and dedicated leadership to allow our boys a maximum opportunity for personal growth and fun as they develop an understanding of their relationship with nature, their fellow man, and God.

The Falling Creek Code is a set of enduring traditional values that provide the framework for everything at camp. The four values are Warrior Spirit, Servant's Heart, Moral Compass, and Positive Attitude.

History

Falling Creek Camp was founded as a boys-only camp in southern Henderson County as a brother camp to nearby Camp Greystone - a camp for girls only. The first session was held in summer 1969 with 110 boys.

The camp has seen a couple of ownership and directorship changes since the camp opened. Yates and Marisa Pharr are the current directors, taking over Falling Creek in 2005.

Camp experience

The camp's structure allows campers to do the activities they want to do while still having a manageable and steady schedule, a philosophy known as "structured freedom". The activities campers can experience include regularly scheduled daily activities, two free periods each day, and a variety of outdoor adventure trips that they can choose to sign up for. These trips take place off-propertu mountain biking, rock climbing, paddling, or backpacking, and range in length from one to five days. The activities all fall into four categories: outdoor adventure, water, sports, and camp classics.

During summer sessions, cabins are grouped into Lines by age.
From youngest to oldest, the names of the lines are Sorrel, Tsuga, Robinia, and Betula. The fifth line is named Samara, for staff who don’t live in cabins with campers. Each of these Lines highlights a specific value from the Falling Creek Camp Code (Positive Attitude, Servant’s Heart, Moral Compass, and Warrior Spirit). Campers live in rustic cabins of eight boys with two counselors. In addition to sharing the same living quarters, cabin mates eat together in the dining hall and go on occasional overnight outings, but choose the activities and trips they want to participate in separately.

Registration

Falling Creek charges between $1650 and $2000 per week, depending on the length of session chosen. The rate is an all-inclusive fee, and campers never need to pay for anything out of pocket. A camp store is also operated, where campers can use their "allowances" (accounts set up by their parents when dropping their sons off) to buy necessities.

Time magazine article

The camp received some notoriety when the July 26, 2007, issue of Time featured the camp on the cover with longtime camper Hayden Futch. The article, called "The Myth About Boys" and written by Time editor David Von Drehle, was researched on-location at Falling Creek in July 2007.

References

Summer camps in North Carolina
Buildings and structures in Henderson County, North Carolina